Nicolas D'Oriano (born 5 May 1997) is a French swimmer. He competed in the men's 1500 metre freestyle event at the 2016 Summer Olympics.

References

External links
 

1997 births
Living people
People from La Seyne-sur-Mer
Olympic swimmers of France
Swimmers at the 2015 European Games
European Games medalists in swimming
European Games gold medalists for France
Swimmers at the 2016 Summer Olympics
Sportspeople from Var (department)
French male freestyle swimmers
20th-century French people
21st-century French people